The American Guide Series includes books and pamphlets published from 1937 to 1941 under the auspices of the Federal Writers' Project (FWP), a Depression-era program that was part of the larger Works Progress Administration in the United States. The American Guide Series books were compiled by the FWP, but printed by individual states, and contained detailed histories of each of the then 48 states of the Union with descriptions of every major city and town. The series not only detailed the histories of the 48 states, but provided insight to their cultures as well. In total, the project employed over 6,000 writers. The format was uniform, comprising essays on the state's history and culture, descriptions of its major cities, automobile tours of important attractions, and a portfolio of photographs.

Many books in the project have been updated by private companies or republished without updating. Although not then a state, a guide for Alaska was published, and also for Puerto Rico (but not for Hawaii).

Origins 

As part of the Federal Writers' Project established under the Emergency Relief Appropriation Act of 1935 and the Works Progress Administration, over 6,500 men and women were employed around the country as writers, collecting stories, interviews, and photographs on a variety of subjects. The project attracted many unemployed writers and artists, offering a wage of twenty dollars a week. President Franklin D. Roosevelt enlisted Henry Alsberg, a journalist and playwright to head the project.

As part of this, the FWP developed and published a series of books that served as guides to the 48 existing states. Each book's primary purpose was to not only outline the history of the individual state, but its culture and geography as well. Their predecessor, Baedeker's Handbook for Travelers: United States, lacked much of what was needed to give a picture of America during the 1930s. Alsberg insisted that the new series of books paint a picture of American culture as a whole and celebrate the nation's diversity. From 1937 to 1941, thousands of writers set out around the country to capture America's culture, conducting fieldwork, interviewing citizens, and observing and recording folk traditions and local customs. Writers from all over the country sought to capture American culture during the Great Depression, a difficult task given the dire circumstances. Alsberg tasked Benjamin A. Botkin, a folklorist and scholar, with running the folklore division of the project. Botkin was responsible for coordinating and managing the writers, a task that was too large for Alsberg to handle, as the volume of work coming in was plentiful for the project. In this role, Botkin not only influenced the writers' folklore division but also had a great influence on their coverage of culture.

The project's beginnings did not come without challenges. During its infancy, various writers' organizations pressured the project because of the parameters that were set by the FWP. With the project bringing many established writers back into the workforce, the Authors' Guild of America became aggressive in the pursuit of relaxing guidelines for the writers, and also developed a disdain for the project's employment of writers with a lack of experience. With the FWP's main focus on creating jobs for the unemployed, the Author's Guild and organizations similar to it continued to criticize the amateurism of many writers on the project. The solution to this critique was a simple one: find enough work for all of the writers. The roles of the writers enlisted to work on the project not only included their initial role as writers, but also as photographers, geographers, and cartographers, allowing the creation of additional white collar jobs.

Creation 
The books in the series were to contain accurate and thorough accounts of American history, according to a letter to State directors on the project. Each book's primary purpose was to not only outline the history of the individual states but the following as well:

 Geography
 Agriculture
 Tourist attractions
 Ethnic groups
 Architecture
 Arts
 Industry

Three different types of guides were published: state, regional, and city guides. Each guide had its own distinct features, but followed the same uniform structure.

State guides 

Each of the 48 existing contiguous states had its own guide. The state guides included stories about the state's heritage, maps of major cities, as well as photographs of historic sites and tourist attractions. Each state's division of the FWP was responsible for printing and distributing the books. The state guides provided great detail as to each state's history. In the case of some states that had joined the union more recently as the nation grew, the guide presented an origin story or folklore account to describe its beginnings. In the California Guide, writers used the story of El Dorado, the mythical tribal thief, to tell readers why settlers yearned to move to the new state in the mid-19th century.

One priority for each guide was to have detailed road maps of cities and major highways throughout each state. The American Baedeker lacked them because during the time it was published, the automobile was not a common asset in everyday life in the country. The state guides also exhibited industries unique to each state. Guides highlighted blue-collar industries such as shipping, mining, and oil rigging, informing readers about what drove state economies. For instance, the Pennsylvania State Guide highlighted the state's shipping industry that helped grow and industrialize the city of Chester, which eventually made a comeback after the depression during World War II.

The guides' main goal of highlighting aspects of the states' cultures and histories was an interesting task for the writers in charge of doing so. Several writers documented these challenges in their memos while working on the project. As the Depression went on, trying to capture normalcy became difficult. The projection of wealth in a nation that was experiencing a drastic rise in poverty was on display in many of the guides. The South Carolina guide presented polo clubs as a popular form of sport and leisure, which were on the rise throughout the country leading up to the Depression. Despite being highlighted as a focal point in the guide, this was in contrast to much of what many of the writers had seen during their travels. Several writers noted in their memos how their perception of a state was changed by the culture that the Depression had created. Overall the guides aimed to draw potential travelers to experience each state's culture, and projecting each state in the utmost positive light was critical to accomplishing this.

Regional guides 

The regional and city guides, similar to their state counterparts, kept much of the same format but had their own specific focuses. The regional guides were designed with a tourist heavy audience in mind, as some of their titles suggest. One of the regional books, Ghost Towns of Colorado, explored some of the most popular deserted towns in the western state. While the state guides provided an overview of tourist attractions in certain regions of the states, the regional guides allowed for a greater magnification of this. The regional guides also showcased the country's diversity in regional attractions, highlighting regions such as New England and vacation destinations such as Cape Cod. Three United States territories, Alaska, Hawaii, and Puerto Rico, were also included in the series, educating Americans about these more recently acquired regions.

City guides 
The city guides had the most narrow scope out of all three types, as the focus was on a single location. Because of this, their maps could be in the greatest detail, not only giving an overview of a city's layout, but individual neighborhoods as well. City Guides highlighted points of special interest in greater detail. In the Philadelphia guide, sites such as Carpenters' Hall and Girard College, an-all boys boarding school in the city's northern section, each had several pages dedicated to them. The maps that were included in each book added value to them as material objects and not just literature. With the increasing mobility afforded by the number of Americans who owned automobiles, the guides served as reliable and durable resources for travelers moving throughout the country.

Impact within New Deal 
Over the course of the five-year span during which FWP workers created the guides, nearly seven thousand writers, editors, researchers and historians were put back to work through working on the American Guide Series. By the project's end the government had spent over $11 billion on employing the personnel on the project. The guides also served as a representation on the New Deal's concern with regional interdependence and national planning, projecting a positive image of the nation during economically harsh times. Many writers were not only put back to work but other writers were able to use the project as a springboard as well, to launch their writing careers.

Legacy 
The guidebooks are the most well-known publication to emerge from the FWP, having been reprinted several times, as scholars and researchers have sought them out for their cultural value. When they were originally published, the guides restored a sense of pride in many of their respected regions, by promoting the history of each state or city, as well as popular tourist attractions and historical sites. From a literary perspective, the guides expanded the definition of American literature. They showed how American writing could cover a wide range of analysis through biographical, folklore, and related geographic content. During the start of the COVID-19 pandemic, several writers and politicians called for a new Federal Writers' Project. Congressman Ted Lieu and Congresswoman Teresa Leger Fernandez introduced legislation to create a new project, garnering support from several writers and journalists.

Gallery

Titles

States

Cities

Regions and territories

References

Further reading
Mangione, Jerre "The Dream and the Deal: The Federal Writers' Project 1935-1943", Little, Brown, 1972 
 
Gross, Andrew S. "The American Guide Series: Patriotism as Brand-Name Identification" Arizona Quarterly: A Journal of American Literature, Culture, and Theory. Vol 62 Number 1. p. 85-111. 2006
Powell, Lawrence N. "Lyle Saxon and the WPA Guide to New Orleans." Southern Spaces 29 July 2009.
Kelly, Andrew. "Kentucky by Design: The Decorative Arts and American Culture", University Press of Kentucky, 2015.  
DeMasi, Susan Rubenstein. Henry Alsberg: The Driving Force of the New Deal's Federal Writers' Project, McFarland and Co., 2016.

See also
 Historical Records Survey
 Index of American Design

External links

 Parigi Books: Gallery of American Guide book covers
 American Guide Series: Guidebooks for each state, including Alaska, Puerto Rico, and Hawaii, published by the Federal Writers' Project of the Works Progress Administration, 1940–42, (121 titles dispersed in the division's collection). From the Rare Book and Special Collections Division at the Library of Congress
University of South Florida Libraries: Tampa WPA Papers Manuscripts and revised typescripts of the Florida edition of the American Guide Series, particularly to the City of Tampa

Works Progress Administration
Travel guide books
Pamphlets
City guides
Series of books
American travel books
American book series
New Deal projects of the arts